John Anderson Cunningham, Baron Cunningham of Felling, PC, DL (born 4 August 1939) is a British politician who was a Labour Member of Parliament for over 30 years, serving for Whitehaven from 1970 to 1983 and then Copeland until the 2005 general election, and had served in the Cabinet of Tony Blair.

Background
His father was Andrew Cunningham, leader of the Labour Party in the Northern Region in the 1970s, who was disgraced in the 1974 Poulson scandal. Dr Cunningham was first elected as member for Whitehaven in 1970, and the renamed Copeland constituency, which was the same as Whitehaven, in 1983.

Early life
He was educated at Jarrow Grammar School (now Jarrow School) in the same class as Doug McAvoy, future general secretary of the National Union of Teachers. Cunningham then studied at Bede College of Durham University, receiving a BSc in Chemistry in 1962, and a PhD in 1967. He stayed at the university to become a research fellow from 1966–8, whilst working as an officer for the General and Municipal Workers' Union.

He was a district councillor for Chester-le-Street Rural & Parish Council, prior to becoming an MP and continued to live in the Garden Farm area of the town, bringing up his family there.

Political career
Cunningham joined the Shadow Cabinet in 1983, and was appointed to be a Deputy Lieutenant of the County of Cumbria in 1991. He ran the Labour Party's general election campaign in 1992. He also appeared on many television election programmes as one of the main spokesmen of the Labour Party.

Minister
After the Labour landslide victory at the 1997 general election, he became Minister of Agriculture, Fisheries and Food and embarked on a modernisation programme for the Ministry. He worked to secure the lifting of the EU ban on the export of UK beef, and achieved some limited success on this.

Cabinet
He was shifted in 1998 to Minister for the Cabinet Office and Chancellor of the Duchy of Lancaster. The media dubbed him cabinet enforcer, claiming that his role was effectively to sell the Government and its policies to the public and the media. He also led the government's work on modernising government, and chaired the Ministerial Committee on genetically modified foods and crops.

Backbenches
He retired from the Cabinet in 1999, and returned to the backbenches. He stood down from Parliament at the 2005 general election. 
Having represented the parliamentary constituency that includes Sellafield, the UK's largest nuclear facility for 35 years; he is a strong proponent of nuclear power and is the founding European legislative Chairman of the Transatlantic Nuclear Energy Forum.

House of Lords
In the 2005 Dissolution Honours, he was raised to the peerage as Baron Cunningham of Felling, of Felling in the County of Tyne and Wear.

Lord Cunningham of Felling is still active in politics and chairs an all-party parliamentary committee to review the powers of the House of Lords.

Lobbyist allegations
Cunningham was suspended from the Labour Party whip, and the party, in June 2013 pending an investigation over claims he had offered to work for lobbyists. He was subsequently cleared of any wrongdoing by the parliamentary standards authorities, and had the Labour whip restored.

Expenses claimed in the House of Lords 
Research conducted by the Guardian newspaper revealed that Lord Cunningham claimed a total of £75,122 for 154 days’ attendance in 2017–2018. This was the largest claim for attendance and travel expenses out of all the sitting members in the House of Lords. £23,108 of the £75,122 was claimed for air travel expenses.

Personal life
He lives with his wife near Stocksfield, in Northumberland and is an avid fly fisherman. In 2016 Cunningham was awarded with the Order of the Rising Sun, Gold and Silver Star.

References

 Announcement of his introduction at the House of Lords House of Lords minutes of proceedings, 11 October 2005

External links 
 

|-

|-

|-

|-

|-

|-

|-

|-

|-

1939 births
Living people
Agriculture ministers of the United Kingdom
Alumni of the College of the Venerable Bede, Durham
Chancellors of the Duchy of Lancaster
Councillors in County Durham
Cumbria MPs
Deputy Lieutenants of Cumbria
Labour Party (UK) MPs for English constituencies
Labour Party (UK) life peers
Members of the Privy Council of the United Kingdom
Parliamentary Private Secretaries to the Prime Minister
UK MPs 1970–1974
UK MPs 1974
UK MPs 1974–1979
UK MPs 1979–1983
UK MPs 1983–1987
UK MPs 1987–1992
UK MPs 1992–1997
UK MPs 1997–2001
UK MPs 2001–2005
People from Stocksfield
Recipients of the Order of the Rising Sun, 2nd class
Life peers created by Elizabeth II